Cole Schwindt (born April 25, 2001) is a Canadian professional ice hockey forward with the Calgary Wranglers in the American Hockey League (AHL) as a prospect to the Calgary Flames of the National Hockey League (NHL). He was selected 81st overall by the Florida Panthers in the 2019 NHL Entry Draft.

Playing career 
Schwindt played as a youth with the Kitchener Jr. Rangers of the Alliance Hockey League before playing major junior hockey with the Mississauga Steelheads of the Ontario Hockey League (OHL).

After his second season with the Steelheads in 2018–19, Schwindt was selected in the third-round, 81st overall, by the Florida Panthers in the 2019 NHL Entry Draft.

In the following 2019–20 season, Schwindt appeared in 57 games with Mississauga, recording a team-leading 71 points with 28 goals and 43 assists. On April 9, 2020, Schwindt was signed by the Panthers to a three-year, entry-level contract.

With the ongoing COVID-19 pandemic delayed the commencement of the 2020–21 season, Schwindt ended his junior career and made his professional debut with the Panthers temporary AHL affiliate, the Syracuse Crunch. Remaining with the Crunch, Schwindt appeared in 10 games registering 2 points.

Approaching the  season, Schwindt attended the Panthers training camp before he was reassigned to primary AHL affiliate, the Charlotte Checkers, to begin the campaign. While quickly regaining his scoring touch, Schwindt was leading the Checkers in goals before he received his first NHL recall to the injury affected Panthers on December 16, 2021. He was immediately inserted in the Panthers shortened lineup that day and made his NHL debut in a 4–1 defeat to the Los Angeles Kings. He was then returned to continue with the Checkers on December 18, 2021.

On July 22, 2022, Schwindt was included in the blockbuster trade for the Panthers along with Jonathan Huberdeau, MacKenzie Weegar and a conditional 2025 first-round selection to the Calgary Flames in exchange for Matthew Tkachuk and a conditional fourth-round selection in 2025.

Career statistics

References

External links
 

2001 births
Living people
Calgary Wranglers players
Charlotte Checkers (2010–) players
Florida Panthers draft picks
Florida Panthers players
Mississauga Steelheads players
Syracuse Crunch players